The Grand National Handicap was an American Thoroughbred race horse first run in 1866 at the newly built Jerome Park Racetrack in Fordham, New York. Open to horses age three and older, the race was contested on dirt at a distance of  miles from inception through 1884. In the late 1880s, there was a growing shortage of handicap horses and track officials shortened the race in an attempt to draw more entrants. In 1885 it was run at  miles, and for its final four years from 1886 through 1889 at  miles.

Because Jerome Park Racetrack had a number of viability problems and did not reopen in 1890, the last time the Grand National Handicap was run was in 1889.

In winning the final two editions of the Grand National Handicap in 1888 and 1889, Raceland defeated the future U.S. Racing Hall of Fame filly, Firenze.

Winners

References

Discontinued horse races
Jerome Park, Bronx